Bernalillo is a town in Sandoval County, New Mexico, United States. As of the 2010 census, the town population was 8,320. It is the county seat of Sandoval County.

Bernalillo is part of the Albuquerque Metropolitan Statistical Area.

History

Wine Festival
In the 1620s, the wine grape was introduced to Bernalillo and the wine industry blew up. Families were making their own wine from scratch and vineyards were flourishing. Unfortunately, the market dipped due to drought and floods. Slowly over time, the wine industry came back into Bernalillo and has sustained its health today, becoming a tradition and staple within the town itself.

The town has embraced its wine heritage and hosts the New Mexico Wine festival yearly during each Labor Day. The event brings in people from all of New Mexico as well as tourists. The event has served as an economic development project for the area as well.

Geography
Bernalillo is located at  (35.309363, -106.552032).
It lies in the Rio Grande Valley of the Albuquerque Basin on the east bank of the Rio Grande.

Demographics

As of the census of 2000, there were 6,611 people, 2,309 households, and 1,724 families residing in the town. The population density was 1,436.9 people per square mile (554.9/km2). There were 2,473 housing units at an average density of 537.5 per square mile (207.6/km2). The racial makeup of the town was 60.17% White, 0.74% African American, 3.92% Native American, 0.20% Asian, 31.34% from other races, and 3.63% from two or more races. Hispanic or Latino of any race were 74.75% of the population. Most of these are descendants of colonial Spanish and Mexican settlers in the area from the 16th through the 19th century.

There were 2,309 households, out of which 40.8% had children under the age of 18 living with them, 49.1% were married couples living together, 18.6% had a female householder with no husband present, and 25.3% were non-families. 20.2% of all households were made up of individuals, and 6.9% had someone living alone who was 65 years of age or older. The average household size was 2.86 and the average family size was 3.30.

In the town, the population was spread out, with 31.0% under the age of 18, 9.9% from 18 to 24, 28.5% from 25 to 44, 21.4% from 45 to 64, and 9.2% who were 65 years of age or older. The median age was 32 years. For every 100 females, there were 93.9 males. For every 100 females age 18 and over, there were 91.4 males.

The median income for a household in the town was $30,864, and the median income for a family was $36,286. Males had a median income of $27,417 versus $22,125 for females. The per capita income for the town was $13,100. About 13.9% of families and 18.2% of the population were below the poverty line, including 25.4% of those under age 18 and 16.3% of those age 65 or over.

Education
Most of Bernalillo is in the Bernalillo Public Schools district. Some is in the Jemez Valley Public Schools district. The former operates Bernalillo High School.

Cultural references
Anton Docher, who became known as "The Padre of Isleta", first served as a priest in Bernalillo after coming as a missionary to the United States from France. He later served for decades in Isleta.

Bernalillo Courthouse is the setting for the marriage between Jimmy "Saul Goodman" McGill and Kim Wexler in Better Call Saul. 

Bernalillo is mentioned several times in Willa Cather's 1927 novel Death Comes for the Archbishop.

Sam Shepard's play The Late Henry Moss is set "on the outskirts of" Bernalillo.

Bernalillo is mentioned and is the scene of part of the action in Ben Sanders book "American Blood" Allen and Unwin 2015

Gallery

See also

 List of municipalities in New Mexico

References

External links

Towns in Sandoval County, New Mexico
Towns in New Mexico
County seats in New Mexico
Albuquerque metropolitan area
New Mexico populated places on the Rio Grande